Canville-les-Deux-Églises (literally Canville the Two Churches) is a commune in the Seine-Maritime department in the Normandy region in northern France.

Geography

Population

Places of interest
 Saint-Martin's church, dating from the eighteenth century.

See also
Communes of the Seine-Maritime department

References

Communes of Seine-Maritime